Grantham railway station is on the East Coast Main Line in the United Kingdom, serving the town of Grantham, Lincolnshire.

Its three-letter station code is GRA.

History

The original station at Grantham (Old Wharf) was opened when the Ambergate, Nottingham, Boston & Eastern Junction Railway opened its line from Nottingham on 15 July 1850. This line was taken over by the Great Northern Railway in 1854. This was replaced by the present station which opened on 1 August 1852; the Old Wharf station closed the following day.

The new station was on the GNR's direct line between Peterborough and Retford (the Towns Line), which was completed in 1852. The alternative route via Boston and Lincoln (the Fens Loop Line) had already opened in 1850. The Boston, Sleaford and Midland Counties Railway opened their line from Barkston Junction, 2 miles north of Grantham, to Sleaford in 1857, and on to Boston in 1859. This railway was taken over by the GNR in 1864. Finally, the Great Northern and London and North Western Joint Railway was opened in 1879. The GNR operated a Grantham to Leicester service via this route.

The early life of the station was marred by some unfortunate accidents. On 25 July 1868, William Collins, a GNR cleaner, was run over by a guard's van and killed. On 4 November 1868, John Boswell, aged 80, was wandering along the line near the station when he was killed by a down train. On 23 May 1873, Thomas Robinson, a GNR engine driver, was struck fatally by a ballast-engine whilst crossing the yard at the station. On 12 March 1887, Eli Addlesee, a driver, was killed by some wagons being shunted in the station  On 27 November 1898, John William Frisby, a GNR shunter, was killed whilst crossing the line near the station.

In 1937, the LNER announced that they planned to lengthen the down platform.

Station Masters

Mr. Withers ca. 1851 - ca. 1854
Mr. Ingram ca. 1855
John Ashley ca. 1858
Mr. Plaskett ca. 1863
John James Ford 1867 - ????
Mr. Bellamy 1878 - 1882
Charles William Wood 1882 - 1901
Arthur Joseph Pott 1902 - 1912 (formerly station master at Newark North Gate)
Ernest Horatio Essame 1912 - 1917 (afterwards station master at Hull)
William Bradley 1917 - 1925
Harry Dennick 1925 - 1930 (afterwards station master at Leicester Central)
C.J.  Cooke 1930 - 1938
Harold Gardner 1938 - 1943 (formerly station master at Lincoln, afterwards station master at London Marylebone)
Harold Scampion 1947 - ca. 1961

Description
Junctions near the town also connect to branches to Nottingham, and to Sleaford and Skegness. The station was built close to the factory of Richard Hornsby & Sons.

It is composed of four platforms; platforms 1 and 2 are on the East Coast Main Line and are responsible for express services between London and Scotland. Platform 1 serves exclusively London King's Cross via Peterborough and Stevenage; Platform 2 serves cities of northern England and Edinburgh. Platform 2, 3 and 4 are formed from a large island platform structure. Platform 3 is a bay platform at the northern end of the station that is used to allow local trains to reverse, while Platform 4 is a two-way platform that is used by East Midlands Railway. Only Platform 1 has amenities, including toilets, refreshments and a buffet.

Prior to the reopening of the Allington Chord in 2006, trains for Nottingham – Grantham – Skegness reversed in the station and travelled along the ECML, crossing the ECML via a flat junction, adding to congestion on the main line. Since the opening of the chord they reverse and travel whence they came using the chord, crossing under the ECML using existing tracks.

The journey to London King's Cross takes a little over an hour, with trains provided by London North Eastern Railway and Hull Trains

In May 2009 National Express East Coast installed ticket barriers. These have since been removed however.

Services

Accidents and incidents

7 July 1898. The 9.25pm up express from Manchester collided with a goods engine which was crossing from the up sidings to the down main line. Six passengers, the guard and both drivers were slightly injured. 
19 September 1906, a sleeper train was derailed after overrunning signals and passing through the station at excessive speed, fourteen people were killed and seventeen were injured.

References

External links

 Pathe newsreel, 1947.  Experimental snowplough at Grantham 

 Summary of 1906 railway accident
 Hull to Grantham station information

Former Great Northern Railway stations
Buildings and structures in Grantham
Railway stations in Lincolnshire
DfT Category C1 stations
Railway stations in Great Britain opened in 1852
Railway stations served by East Midlands Railway
Railway stations served by Hull Trains
Railway stations served by London North Eastern Railway
1852 establishments in England